Emmet Harley Cohen (born May 25, 1990  in Miami, Florida) is an American pianist, composer, bandleader, and educator.

Early life and education 
Emmet Cohen was born in Miami, Florida. He began studying piano at the age of three using the Suzuki method. Cohen was raised in Montclair, New Jersey and attended Montclair High School. While in high school, he was a part of The Gibson/Baldwin Grammy Jazz Ensemble where he met future collaborators Bryan Carter, Benny Benack III, Grace Kelly and Chad Lefkowitz-Brown. Cohen received a Bachelor of Music from the Frost School of Music at the University of Miami in 2012 and a Master of Music from the Manhattan School of Music in 2014.

According to Cohen, listening to and learning from other jazz artists has been a hallmark of his development from a young age. He frequented jazz clubs on his own and with his father, often talking with the artists or sitting in on sessions. Cohen learned to play the Hammond B-3 organ at Cecil's Jazz Club in West Orange, NJ, run by Cecil Brooks III, where he regularly played the B-3 during sessions led by saxophonist Bruce Williams.

Career 
Cohen is primarily known for his work in jazz, although he also studied European art music (classical music) extensively earlier in his career, and this influence is apparent in his technique, occasional improvisational "quotes," and general technical mastery of the keyboard. He has performed with Christian McBride, Herlin Riley, Brian Lynch, Ron Carter, Jimmy Cobb, Albert "Tootie" Heath, Joe Lovano, Eddie Henderson, and George Coleman. As a bandleader, Cohen tours with his band, the "Emmet Cohen Trio," most frequently with his close collaborators bassist Russell Hall and drummer Kyle Poole.

In 2010, while still a student at Frost School of Music, Cohen recorded and self-released his debut album In the Element.  In April 2011, then in his senior year, he won the Kathleen T. and Philip B. Phillips, M.D. Jazz Piano Competition, a nationally recognized jazz performance competition for undergraduate and graduate students at colleges and universities throughout the United States, sponsored by the University of West Florida in Pensacola.

In 2011, after placing third in the Thelonious Monk International Piano Competition, held annually at the Kennedy Center’s Eisenhower Theater in Washington, D.C. Cohen and the two other finalists were invited to a meet and greet at the Oval Office on September 13, 2011 with President Barack Obama.

After graduating from the University of Miami in 2012, Cohen returned to the NY City area and completed a Master of Music (MM) in 2014 at the Manhattan School of Music in New York City, NY, which he also attended on a full merit scholarship.  While there, he released his second and third albums, Infinity (2013), recorded in Italy, and Questioned Answered (2014).  Bryan Lynch in Jazz Times wrote, “Lots of young pianists have chops and energy, but Cohen also has an instinct for meaningful aesthetic form. His spilling runs and chiming resolutions are necessary to an overall design."

Since becoming a professional musician, Cohen has become a “high-in-demand jazz pianist and recording artist."  He has performed at jazz clubs, festivals and music venues throughout the United States and in more than a dozen countries, including the SF Jazz Festival, Monterey Jazz Festival, Newport Jazz Festival, North Sea Jazz Festival (Holland), Bern Jazz Festival (Switzerland).  According to his website, live venues have included, among others, the Village Vanguard, the Blue Note, Dizzy's Club Coca-Cola, Birdland, Jazz Standard, and Lincoln Center's Rose Hall in New York City; the Kennedy Center in Washington DC; Ronnie Scott's in London; Jazzhaus Montmartre in Copenhagen; and the Cotton Club in Tokyo. For many years he was Hammond B-3 organist-in-residence, hosting a weekly late night session at the Smoke Jazz and Supper Club in New York City.

In 2019, Cohen received first-place in the American Pianist Awards, earning him the 2019 Cole Porter Fellowship from the American Pianists Association, which included a $50,000 grant, a recording contract with Mack Avenue Records, and a two-year Artist-in-Residence at the University of Indianapolis.

In October 2020, during the Coronavirus pandemic, with the help of his booking agency, Cohen “managed to revive a European tour originally scheduled for May and string together a dozen dates over 16 days, visiting Italy, Germany, Switzerland and Austria." According to Cohen, he set out to provide “something that the world is lacking—not only jazz, but joy."

In 2021, Cohen released his first album on Mack Avenue records, Future Stride, to strong reviews. According to The Guardian, the reference to stride in the title “refers to a piano style that evolved in 1920s Harlem, and the piece features bursts of stride barging into passages of later styles."  Cohen often discusses his passion for honoring jazz masters, and in a 2021 interview on WVEW FM, he relates the influence of jazz history on his work, and the naming of Future Stride in honor of learning from jazz masters.

Live from Emmet's Place 
Live from Emmet's Place is a weekly video-streaming broadcast and concert produced by Emmet Cohen, most often consisting of Cohen and his trio, bassist Russell Hall, and drummer Kyle Poole, along with invited guest soloists. Guests on Live From Emmet’s Place represent a multigenerational cross section of jazz from the jazz masters such as Houston Person, Joe Lovano, Christian McBride, Eddie Henderson, Steve Davis, Sheila Jordan and Victor Lewis as well as newcomers such as tenor saxophonist Nicole Glover and vocalist Samara Joy. Cohen has featured a variety of jazz musicians and vocalists on 92 livestreams, based on an June 7, 2022 listing of episodes posted on YouTube. Established during the covid-19 pandemic, the viewership has grown from a few hundred to over 1,000 in real time on Facebook and YouTube, with total video views for “Emmet Cohen (weekly)" growing from 1.6M in January 2021 to 11.4M in April 2022 according to SocialBlade.

The weekly livestreams have been called “noteworthy for employing sophisticated production values that set the standard for live internet jazz performance."  According to Downbeat, “On the webcasts, the trio swings deeply, often delivering hairpin turns, starts and stops that might lead one to think they are playing well-rehearsed charts. But, in reality, as Poole explained, the musicians’ seeming telepathy is a result of living and working together for five years—and, more recently, quarantining together."  Chris Robinson wrote, “Perhaps no other album or live performance I’ve recently experienced has hit this sweet spot of fun balanced with serious artistry more than pianist Emmet Cohen’s YouTube series ‘Live from Emmet’s Place’ [...] Cohen, Hall, and Poole’s chemistry and the joy they share in making music is simply infectious."

In December 2021, Cohen initiated Emmet’s Place Education, an ongoing series of free online master classes presented by a variety of jazz artists. Cohen has said that one of his greatest passions is teaching and putting new concepts in front of students, and working with them at their level. He also visits schools, provides lessons to students, teaches master classes, hosts performances, conducts clinics, and gives lectures often in connection with his tour schedule.  

On May 3, 2022, the Jazz Journalists Association voted Cohen their 2022 "Live-Stream Producer of the Year".  The JJA 2022 Jazz Journalism Awards, their 27th annual poll of professional journalist members, received nearly 300 nominations in 12 categories.

Master Legacy Series 
Starting in 2016, Cohen produced a series of albums, live interviews, and performances as part of the Master Legacy Series featuring recognized jazz masters.  Cohen played on the four albums released as of 2021, featuring collaborations with Jimmy Cobb, Ron Carter, Benny Golson, Albert “Tootie" Heath, and George Coleman.

According to Cohen, the series aims to “share the unwritten folklore that is America's unique artistic idiom." Cohen reported that his impetus for this project was a five-hour bus ride in 2013 talking with jazz musician Jimmy Heath who told stories about many older jazz masters:

I felt like there was an urgency and there was a big generation gap. … I wanted to create an artistic project that would allow for the collaboration between the oldest generation and the youngest generation, and really hone in on what that apprenticeship is and should be – with the intergenerational transference of knowledge and passing of the torch…. what it feels like and how we can contribute to the history and the idiom.

About these older jazz musicians Cohen frequently expresses gratitude as well as admiration:

They are all very emphatic about the music, and how it’s guided their lives, and how it’s guided the shape of America. That’s another thing – they’ve lived through the 1950s and the 1960s, and toured in the South in the time of segregation, and were really inventing America’s music in a place where America didn’t accept them. And that story to me is really, really powerful because they gave so much to people… the culture and the society and environment of what it means to be an American.

Recognition 

 2009 Young Arts award (jazz) from the National YoungArts Foundation.
 2011  First Place, Kathleen T. and Phillip B. Phillip’s Piano Competition, a nationally recognized jazz performance competition for undergraduate and graduate students throughout the United States.
 2011 Finalist for the American Pianists Association’s Cole Porter Fellowship.
 2011 Third-place prize in the Thelonious Monk Institute of Jazz International Piano Competition held annually at the Kennedy Center in Washington, DC (now the Herbie Hancock Institute).
 2014 First place in the American Jazz Pianist Competition.
 2015 Finalist in the American Pianists Awards.
 2019 First place in the American Pianists Awards; receiving the Cole Porter Jazz Fellowship valued at over $100,000 (a cash prize, career consultation and concert booking, and a contract with Mack Avenue Records).
 2019 Named UIndy Artist-in-Residence at the University of Indianapolis.
 2021 Featured in JAZZIZ Editors’ Choice playlist for the week of February 1 – Future Stride.
 2021 Recognized in Jazz Week’s Year End Jazz Chart: 2021 - Future Stride most played album on the radio.
 2021 Selected by the Jazz Journalists Association (JJA) as Up and Coming Musician of the Year.
 2021 Lied Center of Kansas 2021–22 IMPACT Award for distinguished service to the performing arts.
 2022 Featured in 2021 JazzTimes Readers’ Poll: Artist of the Year - 4th Place; Acoustic Small Group/Artist - Tied for 3rd Place; Pianist - Tied for 2nd Place.
 2022 DownBeat 70th Annual Critics Poll - #1 Rising Star Pianist and #4 Rising Star Jazz Artist
 2022 DownBeat 87th Annual Readers Poll - #3 Pianist

Discography

As leader 

 In the Element (2011)
 Infinity (Skidoo Records, 2013)
 Questioned Answer (Hollistic MusicWorks, 2014)
 Masters Legacy Series Volume 1: Jimmy Cobb (Cellar Live, 2017)
 Masters Legacy Series Volume 2: Ron Carter (Cellar Live, 2018)
 Emmet Cohen Trio Dirty in Detroit (2018)
 Masters Legacy Series Volume 3: Benny Golson & Albert "Tootie" Heath (2019)
 Masters Legacy Series Volume 4: George Coleman (2019)
 Future Stride (Mack Avenue Records, 2021)
 Uptown in Orbit (Mack Avenue Records, 2022)

As sideman

With Herlin Riley 

 New Direction (Mack Avenue Records, 2016)
 Perpetual Optimism (Mack Avenue Records, 2019)

With Benny Benack III 

 One of Kind (BB3 productions, 2017)

With Veronica Swift 

 Confessions (Mack Avenue Records, 2019)
 This Bitter Earth (Mack Avenue Records, 2021)

With others 

 Troy Roberts, Days Like These (Troy Robot Music, 2019)
 Ashley Pezzotti, We’ve Only Just Begun (2019)
 Jean John, A Love Lane Nocturne ( Zan Tetickovic, 2019)
 Anaïs Reno, Lovesome Thing (Harbinger, 2021)
 The Four Freshmen, The Four Freshmen: Featuring Emmet Cohen, Russell Hall, And Kyle Poole (CD Baby, 2022)

Critical reception 
Cohen has received numerous reviews and accolades in the press, and in a variety of jazz community blogs for his recordings and live performances.  Often noted are his innovative interpretations of jazz standards, his skills as a composer, and his energetic style, while maintaining clean and precise technical skills.  Giovanni Russonello of the New York Times describes his “breezy, phlegmatic command at the keyboard, and a deep well of historical jazz references at his fingertips."  Jeff Tamarkin of JazzTimes writes “Cohen’s skill on his instrument is matched by his inventiveness. His mastery of mainstream-jazz language and his wide-ranging technical facility are pronounced."

Dave Gelly of The Guardian suggested in his review of Future Stride that it “has the rare and elusive quality of charm," and that, although a serious piece, it includes “little eccentricities and the occasional wink."  Writing for Jazziz Magazine, Suzanne Lorge adds, “his originals brim with spontaneity and stylistic allusions without devolving into disarray or languishing in clichés; that he can interpolate so many fleeting musical notions into one mutating composition is astonishing."

Further reading 

 Introducing Emmet Cohen by American Pianists Association
 Emmet Cohen performs at NPR Music
 Emmet Cohen: Hail the Piano Player, interview by AllAboutJazz
 Emmet Cohen Interview: Jazz Across Generations, interview with St. Paul DJ and writer Larry Englund at Twin Cities Jazz Festival
 Before & After: Emmet Cohen, interview with Jazz Times’ Ashley Kahn

References

1990 births
Living people
American jazz pianists
American jazz composers
Musicians from Miami